Madison Fred Mitchell (November 24, 1923 – May 21, 2013) belonged to the New York School Abstract Expressionist artists whose influence and artistic innovation by the 1950s had been recognized around the world. New York School Abstract Expressionism, represented by Jackson Pollock, Willem de Kooning, Franz Kline and others became a leading art movement of the post-World War II era.

Biography

Fred Mitchell was born November 24, 1923, in Meridian, Mississippi. Following graduation from Meridian High School, Mitchell attended the Carnegie Institute of Technology (now Carnegie Mellon University), until his studies were interrupted by military duty.  After serving in the Army, Mitchell enrolled in the Cranbrook Academy of Art, where he eventually received his M.F.A.

He died New York City on May 21, 2013.

Studied painting

1942-1943: Carnegie Institute of Technology, Pittsburgh, PA with scholarship
1948, 1950, 1951: Accademia di Belle Arti, Instituto Meschini, Rome, Italy
1948: Cranbrook Academy of Art, Bloomfield Hills, MI received BFA; Columbia University, New York City in summer; Atelier 17 with Stanley Hayter
1956: Cranbrook Academy of Art, Bloomfield Hills, MI received MFA

Participation in the Downtown Art Scene
In 1947 Mitchell was the winner of Pepsi Cola cash award of $1,500; He sailed to Rome. During his visit to Rome he met painters John Heliker, Afro (Basadella), and Philip Guston, who had major influence on his work. Returning to the US, in 1951 Mitchell moved to New York City and became one of the first painters to open a painting studio in the downtown seaport area along the East River known as Coenties Slip (Manhattan). He soon joined the "Downtown Group" which represented a group of artists who found studios in lower Manhattan. In 1952 Mitchell, Angelo Ippolito, Lois Dodd, Charles Cajori and William King organized the Tanager Gallery, which belonged to the Tenth Street galleries. His friend Philip Pavia introduced Mitchell to 'The Club'.

Teaching positions
Mitchell was also a highly regarded teacher:

1952–1954: Drawing and Painting, Neighborhood House, Riverdale. NY
1954: Finch College, NY; Founded Coenties Slip (Manhattan) School of Art
1956: Positano Art Workshop. Positano, Italy
1955–1959: Cranbrook Academy of Arts, Bloomfield Hills, Michigan
1961–1968: Downtown Art Center, Seamens Church Institute, Coenties Slip (Manhattan), NY
1961–1971: New York University
1968–1969: Cornell University, Ithaca, NY
1973–1974: Queens College, CUNY
1975–1980: Southern Tip School of Art, South Street Seaport, NY
1979–1983: Parsons School of Design Master of Fine Arts program, NY
1985–2003: Art Students League of New York;
1986–2000: Kingsborough Community College, City University, NY

Selected solo exhibitions
1942, 1965: Municipal Gallery, Jackson, Mississippi
1953: Tanager Gallery, New York City
1954: Neighborhood House, New York, NY
1956: Positano Art Workshop, Positano, Italy
1958, 1960, 1961, 1963: Howard Wise Gallery, Cleveland, Ohio and New York
1964: "i" Gallery, La Jolla, CA
1965: Ford Foundation Award, Columbia Museum of Art, Columbia, SC
1966: Wooster Art Center, Danbury, Connecticut
1968: Wisconsin State University, Platteville
1972, 1988: Meridian Museum of Art, Meridian, Mississippi
1973: Image Gallery, Stockbridge, Massachusetts; Roko Gallery, New York City
1974: Queens College Art Library Gallery, Queens, New York; Art Gallery, University of Maine at Machias
1976, 1977: Munson-Williams-Proctor Arts Institute Gallery, Utica, New York; University Art Gallery, SUNY Binghamton
1979: "Southern Tip Series," South Street Seaport Museum, New York City
1982: Landmark Gallery, New York City
1984: University of Oregon Museum of Art, Eugene, Oregon
1987: Kingsborough Community College Art Gallery, New York
1988: Meridian Community College, Casteel Gallery, Mississippi
1996: Horne-Marshall Gallery, Meridian, Mississippi
1997: White Box Gallery, Fred Mitchell Recent Works; Philadelphia, Pennsylvania
1998: Fred Mitchell, Gallery X, New York
2003: David Findlay Jr. Gallery, 'Fred Mitchell', New York
2005: Noel Fine Art, 'Fred Mitchell: New York Harbor Scenes', Bronxville, New York
2007: Joyce Goldstein Gallery, 'Modernism Into Abstraction: Fred Mitchell 1940-1949', Chatham, New York

Selected group exhibitions
1945: "Soldier Art" National Army Arts Contest, National Gallery of Art Washington, D.C.
1946–1949: Detroit Institute of Art, Detroit, MI
1953, 1954: "New York Painting and Sculpture Annual," Stable Gallery, New York City
1954–1955: "Young American Painters," circ., Solomon R. Guggenheim Museum, New York City
1955: "Vanguard Artists," Walker Arts Center, Minneapolis, MN
1956, 1960: "The Founding Five," Tanager Gallery, New York City
1958: "Young American Painters," Rome-New York Foundation, Rome, Italy
1961: Carnegie International, Pittsburgh, PA
1962: "Museum of Modern Art in Embassies," Manila, Philippines
1967: "Art in American Embassies Abroad," U.S. State Department
1968: "Will Insley, Fred Mitchell and Steve Poleskie," A D White Museum, Cornell University, Ithaca, New York 
1974: "Nine Artists, Coenties Slip," Whitney Museum of American Art, Downtown, NY
1975: "Paintings and Watercolors," Hunterdon Art Center, Clinton, NJ
1972, 1973, 1975, 1976, 1983: Buecker & Harpsichords Gallery, NY
1980–1982: "New York Painting," Landmark Gallery, New York City
1985: "The Gathering of the Avant-Garde: The Lower East Side, 1948–1970," Kenkaleba House Gallery, New York City
1990: ULAE Gallery," Waterworks", New York, NY
1998: Gallery X, "Revelations", Harlem, NY
1999: Katherina Rich Perlow Gallery, "The Abstract Tradition: Fred Mitchell, John Ferren, Stephen Pace, John Grillo", New York, NY
2004: The Rockford Art Museum, "Reuniting An Era: Abstract Expressionists of The 1950s", Rockford, IL
2007: Hackett Freedman Gallery, "A Culture in the Making: New York and San Francisco in the 1950s", San Francisco, CA
2008: Robert Miller Gallery, "Beyond The Canon: Small Works in American Abstraction 1945–1965", New York, NY

Notes

References
United States. Army Service Forces. Special Service Division.; National Gallery of Art (US), Soldier art ([Washington] Infantry Journal, ©1945.
Solomon R. Guggenheim Museum, Younger American painters; a selection (from the exhibition held) May 12 to July 25, 1954 (in) the Solomon R. Guggenheim Museum (The Solomon R. Guggenheim Museum, New York, 1954.) p. 32
Tanager Gallery, Paintings and sculpture (New York, 1956.)
Franz Kline; Fred Mitchell; Albert Boime; New York (State); State University at Binghamton; University Art Gallery, Neuberger Museum, Franz Kline: the early works as signals. Selected and organized by Fred Mitchell (Binghamton, N. Y. State University of New York, 1977.)
Charles Le Clair, The art of watercolor (New York : Watson-Guptill Publications, 1994.)  p.  84-85
Marika Herskovic, New York School Abstract Expressionists Artists Choice by Artists, (New York School Press, 2000.)  p.  32; 38; 250–253;
Melville Price, Perle Fine, Robert Richenburg, Michael West, Fred Mitchell, Yvonne Thomas, Abstract expressionism: second to none : six artists of the New York school (Chicago : Thomas McCormick Gallery, 2001.)  p.  10-11
Mary Abbott, Janice Biala, Fritz Bultman, Perle Fine, Fred Mitchell, Melville Price, Robert Richenburg, Yvonne Thomas, Abstract expressionism: second to none : eight artists of the New York school (Chicago : Thomas McCormick Gallery, ©2004.) p.  14-15
April Kingsley, John Corbett, Jim Dempsey, Thomas McCormick, Georgia Museum of Art, Suitcase paintings : small scale Abstract Expressionism (Chicago, Ill. : Art Enterprises : TMG Projects, ©2007.) p. 45
Smithsonian Institution Research Information System; Archival, Manuscript and Photographic Collections, Fred Mitchell

See also
Art movement
Abstract expressionism
Action painting
New York School

External links
Fred Mitchell papers in the Archives of American Art, Smithsonian Institution
Fred Mitchell paintings from Askart.com

Abstract expressionist artists
Modern painters
Artists from New York City
Artists from Mississippi
Carnegie Mellon University alumni
Cranbrook Academy of Art alumni
Columbia University alumni
Art Students League of New York faculty
People from Meridian, Mississippi
Military personnel from Mississippi
1923 births
2013 deaths